Good Things in England is a compendium of recipes written by Florence White and published in 1932. The book includes regional recipes dating back to the 14th century, with short informative introductions to each section. Good Things in England went on to influence a new generation of culinary writers such as Elizabeth David.

Specializing in English food folklore, White had founded the English Folk Cookery Association a year before in 1931. She sought to promote traditional English cuisine in the face of popular French cooking. Via this association, people had sent her traditional recipes.

The book was reprinted in 1951 and again in 1962, but then remained out of print until being republished by Persephone Books in 1999. It was included in The Observer Food Monthly 50 Best Cookbooks series in 2010.

References 

British cookbooks
1932 non-fiction books